= Canadian Fisherman =

1968 Canadian television series

- Genre: Game fishing
- Country of origin: Canada
- Original language: English
- No. of seasons: 1
- No. of episodes: 8

Production
- Running time: 60 minutes

Original release
- Network: CBC Television
- Release: 13 July – 14 September 1968

Canadian Fisherman is a Canadian game fishing television series that aired on CBC Television in 1968.

== Premise ==
This series featured game fishing throughout Canada from British Columbia to the Atlantic provinces.

== Scheduling ==
This hour-long series was broadcast on Saturdays at 4:00 p.m. (Eastern) from 13 July to 14 September 1968.
